The filmography of Sivaji Ganesan (1928–2001) comprises a total of 288 movies with 275 Tamil, 9 Telugu, 2 Malayalam and 2 Hindi. He is the only actor to have played the lead role in over 250 films in Tamil cinema. Apart from these, he has acted in 17 films as honorary appearance.

1950s

1960s

1970s

1980s

1990s

Guest appearance

Television

Notes

References

Bibliography 
 
 
 
 

Indian filmographies
Male actor filmographies